The list of shipwrecks in August 1831 includes ships sunk, foundered, grounded, or otherwise lost during August 1831.

2 August

8 August

9 August

11 August

13 August

16 August

17 August

18 August

19 August

20 August

22 August

23 August

25 August

26 August

27 August

31 August

Unknown date

References

1831-08